Desmond A. McKenzie, JP (born 1 December 1952) is a Jamaican politician and former mayor of the Kingston and Saint Andrew Corporation (KSAC), who held office between July 2003 and January 2012, when he was elected as the Member of Parliament for the constituency of Kingston Western. He currently serves as the Jamaica Labour Party spokesman for urban renewal, rural development and local government.

Prior to that, McKenzie, served as a Junior Spokesman of the Opposition in the Senate of Jamaica in 2002 to 2003. He was a councillor at Denham Town from 1977 to 1984 and at Tivoli Gardens from 1990 to 2011.

Career 
Desmond McKenzie gained national attention when he became the youngest Jamaican vested with the title of Mayor of Kingston, the largest capital city in the English-speaking Caribbean. It was a position he held until he was elected as Member of Parliament for the Kingston Western Constituency in the 2011 general election.

He also held positions as a former President of the Jamaica Labour Party's youth arm, Young Jamaica; Jamaica's representative on the Caribbean and the International Youth Council; and served as vice president of the World Conference of Mayors.

McKenzie is regarded as one of Jamaica's most active mayors, noted for his direct attitude towards stopping crime. When appointed, he was the youngest serving mayor in KSAC's history.

Personal life 
Minister McKenzie is married to Marcia with three sons and two daughters. He lists his hobbies as collecting, selecting and playing music and cricket.

Awards & recognition 
Minister McKenzie's outstanding and dedicated service to Local Government led to him being awarded the Order of Distinction in the Commander Class in 2008. He was also recognized by Rotary International with the Paul Harris Award and became CVM Television's Newsmaker of the Year in 2004.

References 

2. https://opm.gov.jm/cabinet_ministers/desmond-mckenzie/    Office of the Prime Minister, Government of Jamaica. Retrieved 20 March 2021.

Mayors of Kingston, Jamaica
1952 births
Living people
Jamaica Labour Party politicians
Government ministers of Jamaica
Members of the 14th Parliament of Jamaica